Discogobio yunnanensis is a fish species in the genus Discogobio endemic to upper and middle reaches of the Yangtze and some of its drainages in China.

References

External links 

Cyprinid fish of Asia
Taxa named by Charles Tate Regan
Fish described in 1907
Discogobio